Jason Raye Avant (born April 20, 1983) is a former American football wide receiver. He played college football at Michigan and was drafted by the Philadelphia Eagles in the fourth round of the 2006 NFL Draft.

Avant has also been a member of the Carolina Panthers and Kansas City Chiefs.

Early years
Avant attended Carver Military Academy in Chicago, Illinois, graduating in 2002. He spent his freshman year of high school in Decatur, IL at MacArthur High School.  While in high school at Carver, Avant played both on defense, as a free safety, and offense, as a wide receiver. He set school records for receptions (148), receiving yards (2,150), touchdowns (37), and interceptions (18). After his senior season, he was named a High School All-American at free safety.  He played in the 2002 U.S. Army All-American Bowl.

College career
At the University of Michigan, Avant played as a wide receiver and on special teams. He played sparingly as a freshman, but as a sophomore emerged as the Wolverines' number-two receiver, behind Braylon Edwards. During his sophomore season in 2003, Avant caught 47 passes for 772 yards. As a junior, he was the team's second leading receiver. In his senior year, Avant led the team in receptions (82), receiving yards (1,007), and receiving touchdowns (eight).

In his final two seasons, Avant was named as a candidate for the Fred Biletnikoff Award, given to the nation's top receiver.  After his senior season, he was named an honorable mention All-American and was given the Bo Schembechler Award as Michigan's most valuable player.

Professional career

Philadelphia Eagles
Avant was drafted in the fourth round of the 2006 NFL Draft by the Philadelphia Eagles.  The Eagles traded a sixth round draft pick and tackle Artis Hicks to the Minnesota Vikings for the pick used to take Avant. In a post-draft interview, Eagles head coach Andy Reid said Avant "has great hands, toughness, leadership; he's very intelligent and a good route runner."  Scouting reports projected him as a consistent possession receiver who lacked the speed to be a deep threat.

As a part of the Eagles crowded receiving corps, Avant saw limited playing time with the offense in his rookie season.  He had his best performance—four receptions for forty yards and one touchdown—in the final game of the season, while the Eagles rested their starters for the playoffs.

After the 2009 season, in which he set new career-highs in all three categories with 41 receptions for 587 yards and 3 touchdowns, Avant was named to the USA Today All-Joe Team for his stellar play in the slot position. 32 of Avant's 37 catches on third down resulted in a first down.

He was re-signed to a five-year contract on March 8, 2010. He was named the Eagles' Ed Block Courage Award recipient for 2010.

Avant was released from the Philadelphia Eagles on March 4, 2014. The move was unanticipated and came shortly after re-signing Riley Cooper and Jeremy Maclin.

Carolina Panthers
On April 7, 2014, Avant signed a one-year deal with the Carolina Panthers. In week 2 against the Detroit Lions, Avant scored his first touchdown with the Panthers in a 24-7 win, finishing the game with five catches for 54 yards as well. It was Cam Newton's first touchdown pass of the season as he had not played in week 1.

On November 18, 2014, Avant was released by the Panthers. Coach Ron Rivera stated that Avant was released to allow more opportunities for rookie receiver Philly Brown.

Kansas City Chiefs
Avant signed with the Kansas City Chiefs on November 2014, reuniting him with his former Eagles coach Andy Reid. He finished the 2014 season with 34 receptions, 352 yards and only 1 TD. On March 13, 2015, he re-signed with the Chiefs.

In Avant's 2015 season, he recorded only 15 catches for 119 yards for zero touchdowns. Avant was held without a catch 9 out of the 16 games he played. Avant had his best game of the season in a Divisional Playoff loss to the New England Patriots, having 4 receptions for 69 yards.

Personal life
Avant is an avid Scrabble player. During Chris Berman's "Fastest Three Minutes" he referred to him as Jason "You Can't Always Get What" Avant. Avant and his wife, Stacy, live in Clementon, New Jersey. He is the son of Jerry Avant and Claudette Patrick. His brother, Edwon Simmons, was a baseball player, who was drafted by Baltimore Orioles and was a safety at San Diego State. He is now a talent scout for a sports agency in Chicago.

Avant is a Christian. Avant has spoken about his faith saying "I devoted my life to Jesus Christ on May 4, 2003. It was a day when, if you can imagine it, your eyes are opened to a whole different light. On that day, I had a consciousness of God that I never really had before. It’s sort of like being in darkness, but you finally start to see. I realized that day that all of the stuff that I learned growing up was backwards, according to the Scripture. It was the day that changed my life. I started realizing that I had a purpose, and every thought from that day on went through a filter of Jesus Christ first. Before I can make a decision I have to think, ʻWould it be pleasing to God?’".

As of 2017, Avant opened up and runs Launch, a trampoline park in Deptford Township, New Jersey.

See also
Lists of Michigan Wolverines football receiving leaders
List of athletes from Chicago

References

External links
Carolina Panthers bio
Philadelphia Eagles bio

1983 births
American football wide receivers
African-American Christians
American Ninja Warrior contestants
Carolina Panthers players
Kansas City Chiefs players
Living people
Michigan Wolverines football players
People from Clementon, New Jersey
Philadelphia Eagles players
Players of American football from Chicago
Ed Block Courage Award recipients